The Humphrey City Hall, at 407 S. 4th St. in Humphrey, Nebraska, was built in 1902.  It was listed on the National Register of Historic Places in 1996.

It has two fire engine doors.

References

Fire stations in Nebraska
City and town halls in Nebraska
National Register of Historic Places in Platte County, Nebraska
Renaissance Revival architecture in Nebraska
Government buildings completed in 1902